Hugh David Watkins (born 3 September 1963) is a Welsh former rugby union referee. He was selected as a touch judge at the 2007 Rugby World Cup, before being used as a television match official later in the competition. In 2008, he was hired by the Worcester Warriors rugby team as a consultant in charge of reviewing the team's performances. That same year, he was hired as the video referee on the UK television game show Gladiators.

References

1963 births
Living people
Welsh rugby union referees
Worcester Warriors